Viridian is a blue-green pigment, a hydrated chromium(III) oxide, of medium saturation and relatively dark in value. It is composed of a majority of green, followed by blue. Specifically, it is a shade of spring green, which places the color between green and teal on the color wheel, or, in paint, a tertiary blue–green color. Viridian takes its name from the Latin viridis, meaning "green". The first recorded use of viridian as a color name in English was in the 1860s (exact year uncertain).


Variations of viridian

Paolo Veronese green

Paolo Veronese green is the color that is called Verde Verones in the Guía de coloraciones (Guide to colorations) by Rosa Gallego and Juan Carlos Sanz, a color dictionary published in 2005 that is widely popular in the Hispanophone realm.

Paolo Veronese green was a color formulated and used by the noted 16th-century Venetian artist Paolo Veronese.

Paolo Veronese green began to be used as a color name in English sometime in the 1800s (exact year uncertain).

Another name for this color is transparent oxide of chromium.

Viridian green

At right is displayed the color viridian green.

The source of this color is the "Pantone Textile Paper eXtended (TPX)" color list, color #17-5126 TPX—Viridian Green.

Generic viridian

Generic viridian is the color that is called Viridian inspecifico in the Guía de coloraciones (Guide to colorations) by Rosa Gallego and 
Juan Carlos Sanz, a color dictionary published in 2005 that is widely popular in the Hispanophone realm.

Spanish viridian

Spanish viridian is the color that is called Viridian specifico in the Guía de coloraciones (Guide to colorations) by Rosa Gallego and 
Juan Carlos Sanz, a color dictionary published in 2005 that is widely popular in the Hispanophone realm.

In popular culture

Although viridian is a less-used color name in English, it is used in a number of cultural references, probably because it is derived from viridis, the Latin word for green, so using the word viridian sounds more elegant than simply referring to the Old English word green.

Automobiles
"Viridian Joule" was the winning color name in Chevrolet's Volt Paint-Color Naming Contest.

Broadcasting
Viridian was the signature color of BBC Two's identity from 1991–2001.

Television 
Viridian was the name of an Orion starship in Star Trek: Discovery

Environmental Design
The viridian design movement is a popular design movement based on a bright green environmentalism philosophy.

Film
Viridian is mentioned by Otho when discussing remodeling, in the 1988 film Beetlejuice.

Music
 "Viridian" is the seventh song on Between the Buried and Me's Colors.
 "Viridian (Interlude)" is the sixteenth track on Bethel Music's Without Words: Synesthesia
 Viridian is the name of the ninth studio album by rock band Closterkeller whose releases are usually named after colors
 "Viridian" is the fourth song in Novo Amor's 2022 instrumental album Antarctican Dream Machine

 Literature
 In the Space opera series Dread Empire's Fall, by American author Walter Jon Williams, the first mention of viridian is in the initial book of the series, The Praxis   for both the sky color of Shaa Empire capital world Zanshaa as well as color of the uniforms of their Fleet.

Video games
In the Pokémon franchise, in the Kanto region, Viridian City is the first town one encounters after leaving Pallet Town via Route 1 and also home to the final gym.
In VVVVVV, the player character is Captain Viridian, who is a light blue-green color. All characters have names referencing their color and starting with the letter V.
In Knights of the Old Republic II the player character can find and use a viridian lightsaber crystal.
In League of Legends the champion Kayle has a viridian costume that is green with black wings.
In Phoenix Wright: Ace Attorney − Trials and Tribulations, there is a running joke about the color, started by the character Larry Butz.
In the Steam game Aviary Attorney, the Viridian Killer is responsible for murders in France during the 1830s.

See also
List of colors
List of inorganic pigments
Green pigments

References

Further reading
Newman, R., Chromium Oxide Greens, in  Artists’ Pigments, A Handbook of Their History and Characteristics, Vol 3: E.W. Fitzhugh (Ed.) Oxford University Press 1997, p. 273 – 286

External links
Viridian, Pigments through the Ages, Webexhibits. Information about the color viridian, its history, making of, and its chemistry
Viridian, Colourlex
Viridian Red Noida, Viridian Red Noida

Quaternary colors
Shades of cyan
Inorganic pigments
Chromium(III) compounds
Transition metal oxides